Venom: Let There Be Carnage is a 2021 American superhero film featuring the Marvel Comics character Venom, produced by Columbia Pictures in association with Marvel. Distributed by Sony Pictures Releasing, it is the second film in Sony's Spider-Man Universe and the sequel to Venom (2018). The film was directed by Andy Serkis from a screenplay by Kelly Marcel, based on a story she wrote with Tom Hardy, who stars as Eddie Brock and Venom alongside Michelle Williams, Naomie Harris, Reid Scott, Stephen Graham, and Woody Harrelson. In the film, Brock and the alien symbiote Venom must face serial killer Cletus Kasady (Harrelson) after he becomes the host of an offshoot of Venom named Carnage.

Venom was intended by Sony to be the start of a new shared universe, and plans for a sequel began during production on the first film. Harrelson was cast to make a brief appearance as Kasady at the end of Venom, with the intention of him becoming the villain Carnage in the sequel. Official work on the sequel began in January 2019, with Hardy and Harrelson confirmed to return along with Marcel as writer. Serkis was hired as director that August, partly due to his experience working with CGI and motion capture technology, which was an important part of portraying Venom and Carnage in the film. Filming took place at Leavesden Studios in England from November 2019 to February 2020, with additional filming in San Francisco in February. The title was announced in April 2020.

Venom: Let There Be Carnage premiered in London on September 14, 2021, and was theatrically released in the United States on October 1, after multiple delays from an initial October 2020 date due to the COVID-19 pandemic. The film was a box office success, grossing $506.9 million worldwide and becoming the seventh-highest-grossing film of 2021. It received mixed reviews from critics, who praised the action sequences, chemistry between Brock and Venom, mid-credit scene, and the performances of Hardy and Harrelson, but criticized its screenplay, while its short runtime drew divided opinions. A third Venom film is in development.

Plot
In 1996, a young Cletus Kasady watches helplessly as his lover, Frances Barrison, is taken away from St. Estes Home for Unwanted Children to the Ravencroft Institute. On the way, Barrison uses her sonic scream powers to attack young police officer Patrick Mulligan. Mulligan shoots Barrison in the eye and suffers an injury to his ear due to her scream. Unbeknownst to Mulligan, who believes he killed her, Barrison is still taken to Ravencroft, where her abilities are restricted.

In the present day, Mulligan is now a detective and asks journalist Eddie Brock to speak to serial killer Kasady in San Quentin State Prison, as Kasady refuses to talk to anyone other than Brock. After the visit, Brock's alien symbiote Venom deduces where Kasady has hidden the bodies of his victims, which gives Brock a considerable career boost. Brock is contacted by his ex-fiancée Anne Weying, who tells him that she is now engaged to Dr. Dan Lewis, to Venom's displeasure. Kasady, who has been found guilty of his crimes and sentenced to death by lethal injection, invites Brock to attend his execution. Brock speaks with Kasady, who insults Brock, provoking Venom to attack Kasady. Kasady bites Brock's hand and ingests a small part of the symbiote. Back home, Venom has an argument with Brock about wanting more freedom to eat criminals, and the symbiote decides to leave Brock's body and go off on its own.

As Kasady's execution begins, a red symbiote emerges and blocks the injection. Named Carnage, it goes on a violent rampage through the prison, freeing inmates and killing guards. Carnage agrees to help Kasady break Barrison out of Ravencroft in exchange for Kasady's help eliminating Brock and Venom. Mulligan visits Brock at home and warns him about the situation. At Ravencroft, Kasady frees Barrison, and they travel to the St. Estes children's home to burn it down. Mulligan grows suspicious of Brock and arrests him. Brock contacts Weying as his lawyer and reveals that Venom has separated from him. As Venom makes his way through San Francisco by hopping from body to body, Weying finds him bonded to Mrs. Chen and convinces him to forgive Brock. Venom reunites with Brock, and they escape custody. Kasady takes Mulligan hostage, and Barrison captures Weying, taking them both to a cathedral where Kasady and Barrison plan to get married.

Brock and Venom arrive to fight Carnage while Barrison seemingly kills Mulligan by hanging him with a chain. Venom is overpowered by Carnage but provokes Barrison into using her powers to separate Carnage and Kasady. Venom devours Carnage and kills Kasady while the collapsing cathedral crushes Barrison. Later, an alive Mulligan's eyes flash blue, revealing that he somehow absorbed a part of Carnage. Brock and Venom, now fugitives, decide to take a vacation while they ponder their next steps. In a mid-credit scene, as Venom tells Brock about the symbiotes' knowledge of other universes, a blinding light transports them from their hotel room to another room where they watch J. Jonah Jameson talking about Spider-Man's revealed identity as Peter Parker on television. Venom then licks the screen after saying, "That guy."

Cast 

 Tom Hardy as Eddie Brock / Venom:An investigative journalist who is the host of an alien symbiote, Venom, that imbues him with superhuman abilities. Director Andy Serkis described Brock and Venom's relationship as being in the "Odd Couple stage" in the film, with Venom trapped in Brock's body and just wanting to be the "Lethal Protector" which distracts Brock from work and putting his life back together.
 Michelle Williams as Anne Weying: A defense attorney and Brock's ex-fiancée, who briefly hosts Venom.
 Naomie Harris as Frances Barrison / Shriek:Kasady's lover who can create sonic screams. Serkis described her as a damaged soul who has been living in isolation and has a dark side to her. Olumide Olorunfemi portrays a young Barrison.
 Reid Scott as Dan Lewis: A doctor and Weying's fiancé.
 Stephen Graham as Patrick Mulligan: A detective hoping to use Brock to find the remains of Kasady's murder victims. Sean Delaney portrays a young Mulligan.
 Woody Harrelson as Cletus Kasady / Carnage:A psychotic serial killer who becomes the host of Venom's spawn, Carnage. While in prison, Kasady refuses to talk with anyone besides Brock, who he considers to be a kindred spirit. Kasady looks different compared to his appearance in the mid-credits scene of Venom, which Serkis said indicates the passage of time between films; the character's hair was changed for the sequel so it would not be distracting to the audience, coupled with Harrelson's dislike for the earlier hairstyle and preference for a more realistic one. Harrelson was initially reluctant to provide the voice for Carnage and wanted Serkis to perform it instead, but Serkis encouraged him to find the right tone for the character. Jack Bandeira portrays a young Kasady.

Additionally, Peggy Lu reprises her role from the first film as convenience store owner Mrs. Chen, who briefly hosts Venom, Sian Webber portrays Ravencroft doctor Camille Pazzo, Larry Olubamiwo appears as a Ravencroft guard, and Little Simz appears as herself. Footage of Tom Holland as Peter Parker / Spider-Man and J. K. Simmons as J. Jonah Jameson from the Marvel Cinematic Universe (MCU) appears in the mid-credits scene, with both actors uncredited.

Production

Development 
During the long development of the 2018 film Venom, the character Carnage was expected to appear as an antagonist. During pre-production on that film, the creative team decided not to include the character so they could focus on introducing the protagonists, Eddie Brock and Venom. Director Ruben Fleischer felt that leaving Venom's most formidable villain for a sequel would give the franchise a place to go and would be a natural next step, so Carnage's alter-ego Cletus Kasady was introduced in a mid-credits scene at the end of the first film with the intention of featuring him in a sequel. Fleischer wanted to cast Woody Harrelson in the role, feeling there was a natural connection between the character and Harrelson's performance in Natural Born Killers (1994), and asked Harrelson while the pair were discussing a sequel to their film Zombieland (2009). After meeting with Fleischer and Tom Hardy—who portrays Brock and Venom—for dinner, Harrelson agreed to take on the part. Harrelson described his decision as a roll of the dice since he was unable to read a script for the sequel before signing on to the first film. In August 2018, ahead of Venoms release, Hardy confirmed that he had signed on to star in two sequels. At the end of November 2018, Sony gave an October 2, 2020, release date to an untitled Marvel sequel that was believed to be Venom 2, which would place the film in the same release timeframe as the first Venom; box office analysts believed Venom had been successful enough to guarantee a sequel would be made.

Venom writer Jeff Pinkner confirmed in December 2018 that a sequel was happening, but he was not involved in writing it. Fleischer reiterated this, saying that he could not discuss a sequel but he saw the first film as Brock and Venom "coming together. So there's a natural evolution from that to [a sequel where it is] like, okay, now what's it like to live together? It's like a bromantic sort of relationship." In January, Kelly Marcel signed a "significant" deal with Sony to write and produce the sequel after also working on the first film's script. This marked the official beginning of work on the film for the studio, and was revealed alongside confirmation of Avi Arad, Matt Tolmach, and Amy Pascal returning as producers. Hardy and Harrelson were also expected to return for the sequel, along with Michelle Williams in the role of Brock's ex-fiancée Anne Weying. No director was confirmed, with Sony considering replacing Fleischer due to his commitments to Zombieland: Double Tap (2019), though he still intended to be involved in Venom 2. By the end of July 2019, Sony hoped for filming to begin that November and had met with several candidates to replace Fleischer as director since he was still completing work on Double Tap; directors the studio met with include Andy Serkis, Travis Knight, and Rupert Wyatt. Sony was also interested in Rupert Sanders directing the film, but that "didn't work out". Serkis confirmed at the start of August that he had discussed the project with Sony and it was "potentially something that might happen".

Serkis was officially hired to direct the film in early August 2019, partly due to his experience working with CGI and motion-capture technology as both an actor and director. Soon after his hiring, Serkis said Hardy had been working closely with Marcel on the screenplay which was "centered around their take"; Marcel explained that she and Hardy spent months developing ideas for the film, which is the first time he received a story credit on a project, before she then spent three months writing the screenplay herself. Fleischer said he was happy to let Serkis take over the franchise following the negative critical reaction that the first film received, believing reviewers had unfairly treated the "crowdpleasing movie", potentially due to biases against Sony and towards Marvel Studios' rival superhero films. By the time Serkis was hired, Hutch Parker had joined the sequel as a producer. A friend of Sony Pictures chairman Tom Rothman, Parker previously served as a producer for several Marvel-based films produced by 20th Century Fox.

Pre-production 
In September 2019, Reid Scott was expected to reprise his role as Weying's boyfriend Dan Lewis from the first film. The character Shriek was also expected to appear as the film's secondary villain and a love interest for Carnage. Many different actresses were looked at for the part, before Naomie Harris was cast in the role in mid-October. Stephen Graham had also joined the film, as Detective Mulligan, by the end of the year. Tolmach said there was a chance the sequel could be rated R following the success of the R-rated Joker (2019), as well as previous successful R-rated comic book films such as Deadpool (2016) and Logan (2017). However, Tolmach cautioned that the PG-13 rating of the first Venom had led to box office success and they would not be looking to change the franchise's tone simply because it had worked for others; the sequel ultimately received a PG-13 rating. Tolmach said the biggest lesson learned from the first Venom was that fans loved the relationship between Brock and Venom, and the sequel would focus more on the two characters together because of this. Serkis described the relationship as the "central love affair" of the film, and explained that the sequence in the film where Venom goes to a rave and talks about the "cruel treatment of aliens" uses imagery reminiscent of LGBTQIA festivals because the sequence is intended to be Venom's "coming-out party". Chinese production company Tencent Pictures co-financed the sequel after previously doing the same for the first film.

Filming 
Principal photography began on November 15, 2019, at Leavesden Studios in Hertfordshire, England, under the working title Fillmore. Robert Richardson served as cinematographer for the film, reuniting with Serkis after they worked together on Breathe (2017). Filming took place at the campus of London South Bank University in mid-January 2020. Hardy revealed that filming in England was completed on February 8, with the production then moving to San Francisco where the film is set. Location filming continued in that city for several weeks, taking place in several neighborhoods including the Tenderloin, North Beach, Nob Hill, and Potrero Hill. In Potrero Hill, the Anchor Brewery stood in for a police station, while filming in Nob Hill took place at Grace Cathedral on February 20 and 21. Filming also took place at the Palace of Fine Arts in the Marina District. Some filming in San Francisco was impacted by production on The Matrix Resurrections (2021), with certain locations such as roads for driving scenes being unavailable to the Venom crew because that film was already using them. Helicopters that were being used to film Matrix sequences are visible in the background of a scene in the Venom sequel which uses dialogue to explain them as being police helicopters searching the city. Reshoots occurred at Pinewood Studios.

Post-production 
Post-production for the film began shortly before many film productions were forced to shut down due to the COVID-19 pandemic, with Serkis beginning work editing the film in London with the editorial department. Once post-production had to be shut down, the film's editor returned to the United States and began working with Serkis remotely to finish editing the film. The initial director's cut for the film was around 10 or 15 minutes longer than the final runtime, with Serkis wanting the film to be shorter than expected to make it a "real thrill ride" and to try get to Carnage's introduction with as little exposition as possible.

Sony confirmed in April that the film was scheduled to be released on October 2, 2020, and was intended to keep that release date despite the pandemic. Later that month, the studio moved the film's release to June 25, 2021, after that date became available due to other COVID-19 related delays. Sony also announced the film's title as Venom: Let There Be Carnage. An alternate title that was considered for the film was Venom: Love Will Tear Us Apart, which was named for the Joy Division song "Love Will Tear Us Apart". Serkis felt the delay in release would give more time to improve the film's visual effects, and would help ensure that audience members would be comfortable with going to see the film in theaters. The director was excited to adapt the comic book version of Carnage for the screen, and explained that the symbiotes were designed to reflect their hosts, so he differentiated Venom and Carnage by reflecting Brock and Kasady, respectively, through their designs, abilities, and movements. Serkis worked with dancers and actors on a motion-capture stage to help define the movements of the two characters, and compared Venom to a quarterback who used brute force. For Carnage, Kasady's psychotic personality is shown through idiosyncratic and off-kilter movements, as well as being able to turn into mist and create "all manner of tendrils". Serkis compared fighting Carnage to fighting with an octopus. The film's mid-credits scene was directed by Spider-Man: No Way Home (2021) director Jon Watts during production of that film.

In March 2021, the film's release was moved back again to September 17, 2021, and then moved a week later to September 24. In August 2021, amidst SARS-CoV-2 Delta variant surges in the United States, the film was delayed again to October 15, 2021. By the end of the month, Sony was reportedly considering delaying the film to Morbius release date of January 21, 2022, following continued Delta variant surges and low box office returns for films released earlier in August. Variety reported that the studio was not planning to move the film again at that time, but Deadline Hollywood described plans to change the film's release date as "the worst kept secret in Hollywood". Following the box office success of Shang-Chi and the Legend of the Ten Rings in early September, Sony moved the film's release date forward two weeks to October 1.

Music 

Marco Beltrami was revealed to be the composer for the film in December 2020, after previously composing for several Marvel-based films produced by Parker. In September 2021, Eminem was revealed to be composing a new song for the film after doing the same for the first Venom. Titled "Last One Standing", it was made in collaboration with Skylar Grey, Polo G, and Mozzy.

Marketing 
After announcing the film's official title in April 2020, Sony also released a short teaser featuring the official logo for the film. Many fans of the Venom comic books criticized the title, with some wondering why the comic book storyline title Maximum Carnage was not used. Sam Barsanti of The A.V. Club also thought Maximum Carnage would have worked better, or even Venom 2, and negatively compared the official title to films like Batman v Superman: Dawn of Justice (2016), The Assassination of Jesse James by the Coward Robert Ford (2007), and Legend of the Guardians: The Owls of Ga'Hoole (2010). /Films Ethan Anderton acknowledged these criticisms, but felt it was a great title given the first film was "surprisingly goofy". Vinnie Mancuso at Collider agreed, calling it "the perfect title for a beautifully stupid franchise". He said it suggested Sony "knows the kind of property it has on its hands". Tom Reimann, also at Collider, described the teaser as Sony "proudly showing off the logo of the new film as if the title isn't completely insane".

In March 2021, Serkis said a trailer for the film had not yet been released due to the COVID-19 pandemic, with Sony waiting until audiences could see it in theaters. The film's first trailer was released in May, with Ryan Parker of The Hollywood Reporter describing it as intense but with some lighter moments. Parker highlighted Harrelson's improved wig compared to the first film, as did Colliders Rafael Motamayor, and Corey Chichizola at CinemaBlend. Chichizola praised Harrelson's presence in the trailer, and expressed excitement at the brief shots of Venom and Carnage, with Michael Kennedy of Screen Rant noting that the first trailer for Venom had received negative responses for not featuring Venom in it and this trailer avoided that problem by showing both of the sequel's symbiote characters. A second trailer was released in August, with Sam Barsanti of The A. V. Club highlighting the expanded footage of Carnage as well as the continued focus on Brock and Venom's chemistry. Lauren Massuda at Collider concurred with Barsanti on both points, and felt Harrelson had "taken the spotlight" of the second trailer. Massuda felt the sequel appeared more intriguing and mature than the first film, while Screen Rant James Hunt opined that the sequel "already looks much better" than the first film in terms of tone, character, and visual effects. In September, a character poster for Weying was alleged to have copied the silhouette of She-Venom from fan art published by DeviantArt artist spaceMAXmarine in October 2018. In December, to promote the digital and then-upcoming Blu-ray home media release of the film, a web series titled Chen's Market was released to Facebook and Instagram Live, starring Peggy Lu and Santana Maynard, the former reprising their roles from the film, alongside the voices of Hardy and Jon Bailey.

Release

Theatrical 
Venom: Let There Be Carnage was screened for fans in London on September 14, 2021, and was released in the United States on October 1 in RealD 3D and IMAX. In August 2021, Sony and CJ 4DPlex announced a deal to release 15 of Sony's films over three years in the ScreenX format, starting with Let There Be Carnage. The film was originally set for release in the U.S. on October 2, 2020. It was delayed several times due to the COVID-19 pandemic, moving to June 25, 2021, September 17, September 24, and then October 15, before being moved back up to October 1.

Home media 
The film debuted atop the iTunes, Google Play, and Vudu charts following its release on PVOD services in late November 2021. In April 2021, Sony signed a deal giving Disney access to their legacy content, including Marvel content in Sony's Spider-Man Universe (SSU), to stream on Disney+ and Hulu and appear on Disney's linear television networks. Disney's access to Sony's titles would come following their availability on Netflix.

Reception

Box office 
Venom: Let There Be Carnage grossed $213.6million in the United States and Canada, and $293.3million in other territories, for a worldwide total of $506.9million.	

In the United States and Canada, the film was released alongside The Many Saints of Newark and The Addams Family 2, with Sony estimating a $40 million debut and box office analysts predicted it could reach as much as $65 million in its opening weekend. The film grossed $37.3 million on its first day, which included $11.6 million from Thursday night previews, besting the $10 million made by the first Venom and marking the second-biggest total since the start of the COVID-19 pandemic, behind Black Widow $13.2 million. In its opening weekend, Let There Be Carnage debuted to $90.1 million, marking the largest opening of the pandemic to that point, and surpassing the opening weekend gross of Venom ($80.3 million). The film declined 64% in its second weekend with $32 million, finishing second behind newcomer No Time to Die. During the weekend ending November 14, Let There Be Carnage became the second film to cross the $200 million mark at the United States and Canadian box-office during the pandemic, following Shang-Chi and the Legend of the Ten Rings. It ended its box office run as the third highest-grossing film of 2021 in this region.

Critical response
The review aggregation website Rotten Tomatoes reports an approval rating of 57% based on 276 reviews, with an average rating of 5.4/10. The website's critical consensus reads, "A sequel aimed squarely at fans of the original's odd couple chemistry, Venom: Let There Be Carnage eagerly embraces the franchise's sillier side." Metacritic assigned the film a weighted average score of 49 out of 100, based on 48 critics, indicating "mixed or average reviews". Audiences polled by CinemaScore gave the film an average grade of "B+" on an A+ to F scale, the same as the first film, while those at PostTrak gave it a 76% positive score, with 65% saying they would definitely recommend it.

Writing for RogerEbert.com, Christy Lemire gave the film 3 out of 4 stars and praised Hardy's "gung-ho physical performance". Kristen Page-Kirby of The Washington Post praised the film, commenting, "It's fast, it's fun, and buried within is a genuinely sweet story about friendship and self-acceptance." Tim Grierson of Screen International said that Serkis' direction "keeps the rambunctious proceedings relatively taut, making room for operatic action and a sneaky emotional undercurrent that pokes through the broad comedy and comic-book grandeur." James Mottram of the South China Morning Post gave the film a score of 4/5 stars, writing that the film "is simplified, more focused and even more intimate than its predecessor – employing only a handful of characters and a remarkably stripped down narrative." Clarisse Loughrey of The Independent also gave the film a score of 4/5 stars, describing it as "a love story written in blood, sweat and the slime of half-eaten brains." Tim Robey of The Daily Telegraph gave the film a score of 3/5 stars, writing: "Venom: Let There Be Carnage is refreshingly nuts, and benefits from being a whole 45 minutes shorter than its predecessor." Joe Morgenstern of The Wall Street Journal wrote that the film "manipulates its audience with all the tentacles it can deploy, most of them cheerfully ridiculous."

Richard Roeper of the Chicago Sun-Times gave the film a mixed review, giving it a score of 2/4 stars. He described the film as being "marginally better than the original, with a firmer commitment to the comedic angle and Tom Hardy clearly having a lot of fun", but added: "this vehicle runs out of gas halfway through the yawner of a climax." John DeFore of The Hollywood Reporter wrote: "The film does develop the chemistry between the titular alien and the human he's forced to inhabit while inside Earth's atmosphere. But the distinctiveness of this buddy-movie bond is often drowned out by giant set pieces of CG mayhem that feel exactly like those found in the good guys' movies." Brian Lowry of CNN was more critical of his review for the film and described the film as "a mind-numbingly tiresome sequel, filled with uninspired comedy and a CGI monster fight that seems to drag on forever." David Sims of The Atlantic described the viewing experience as being "like going to a nightclub and having someone scream the plot in your ear over a thumping bass line". Kevin Maher of The Times gave the film a score of 1/5 stars, describing it as an "abominable sequel".

William Hughes at The A.V. Club believed the mid-credits scene would overshadow the rest of the film, saying "in the span of about 120 seconds, the most externally interesting thing about Sony's latest big superhero blockbuster... [is] its connection to a whole other studio's library of films". He continued that the two Venom films were "at least genuinely interesting and weird... propelled by a devotedly odd performance" from Hardy, but ultimately felt Let There Be Carnage would become "little more than 'the one where Venom gets pulled into the MCU". Barry Hertz of The Globe and Mail praised the film's mid-credits scene, but described the rest of the film as "ugly, cheap and dumb-but-not-good-dumb" and "a throwaway kind of trashy nothingness".

Accolades

Sequel 
Hardy stated in August 2018 that he had signed on to star in three Venom films. In September 2021, Hardy noted that the producers would have to continue to develop Sony's Spider-Man Universe (SSU) in future films but said they were also interested in crossing-over with the Marvel Cinematic Universe (MCU) more. Serkis expressed interest in returning to direct another Venom film, and felt there was more to explore with Venom in future films before the character met Spider-Man in a future crossover film, including further exploration of the Ravencroft Institute and other potential villains being held there. In October, Holland said he and Pascal had discussed him potentially reprising his role as Spider-Man in future Venom sequels. That December, Pascal said they were in the "planning stages" of Venom 3. Sony confirmed the film was in development at CinemaCon in April 2022. In June, Hardy revealed that Marcel was writing the script after previously working on the prior Venom films, and that he was co-writing the story with her. That October, Marcel was set to make her directorial debut with the film and to also produce it. Serkis said that he was unable to return due to his commitments to Animal Farm, which he delayed to work on Let There Be Carnage. Hardy revealed in February 2023 that pre-production work had begun.

See also 
 List of Marvel Cinematic Universe films

Notes

References

External links 
 
 

2020s English-language films
2020s monster movies
2020s superhero films
2020s American films
2021 science fiction action films
4DX films
American action films
American science fiction action films
American sequel films
American superhero films
Columbia Pictures films
Films about extraterrestrial life
Films about journalists
Films based on works by Todd McFarlane
Films directed by Andy Serkis
Films postponed due to the COVID-19 pandemic
Films produced by Amy Pascal
Films produced by Avi Arad
Films produced by Matt Tolmach
Films scored by Marco Beltrami
Films set in 1996
Films set in 2024
Films set in California
Films set in San Francisco
Films shot at Warner Bros. Studios, Leavesden
Films shot in Hertfordshire
Films shot in London
Films shot in San Francisco
Films using motion capture
Films with screenplays by Kelly Marcel
IMAX films
ScreenX films
Sony's Spider-Man Universe
Tencent Pictures films
Venom (film series)
Films shot at Pinewood Studios